The 2017–18 2. Frauen-Bundesliga was the fourteenth season of Germany's second-tier women's football league. This was also the last before the league reform; the next season was played in one division instead of two.

Nord
The season started on 3 September 2017 and ended on 13 May 2018. Jahn Delmenhorst was promoted from the 2016–17 Regionalliga Nord and FF USV Jena II was promoted from the 2016–17 Regionalliga Nordost.

Results

Top scorers

Süd
The season started on 2 September 2017 and ended on 13 May 2018. 1. FC Köln II was promoted from the 2016–17 Regionalliga West, SG Andernach was promoted from the 2016–17 Regionalliga Südwest and SC Freiburg II was promoted from the 2016–17 Regionalliga Süd.

Results

Top scorers

Relegation play-offs
The two seventh-placed teams from the two 2. Bundesliga divisions, the five division champions from the 2017–18 Regionalliga and one second-placed team from the Regionalliga were divided into two groups of four to compete for two more spots in the 2018–19 2. Bundesliga.

The matches were played on 21 May, 27 May and 3 June.

Group 1

Group 2

References

2017-18
2